Roadrage 2003 is a compilation DVD featuring various artist with Roadrunner Records.

Track listing
 My Plague (New Abuse Mix – Director's Cut) – Slipknot
 Back to the Primitive (Uncensored version) – Soulfly
 Fixation on the Darkness – Killswitch Engage
 Unreal – Ill Niño
 God Save Us – Ill Niño
 Loco – Coal Chamber
 Smothered – Spineshank
 Synthetic – Spineshank
 Resurrection – Fear Factory
 The Blood, the Sweat, the Tears (live) – Machine Head
 Roots Bloody Roots – Sepultura
 Down Again – Chimaira
 Sp Lit – Chimaira
 I Don't Wanna Be Me – Type O Negative
 Inhale – Stone Sour
 White Wedding – Murderdolls
 Tabula Rasa – Sinch
 Nothing Could Come Between Us – Theory of a Deadman
 Too Bad – Nickelback
 Kry – Life of Agony
 Medicated – Downthesun
 Scream! – Misfits

2003 compilation albums
2003 video albums
Music video compilation albums